Peperomia vulcanica is a species of herbaceous flowering plants of the family Piperaceae.

Description
It is a creeping plant, rooting at nodes. It has erect lateral branches that are 20–30 cm tall.

Distribution
The species is found in rocky areas and rarely as an epiphyte at 250 to 2400 m elevation in São Tomé and Príncipe, Annobón and Liberia.

References

vulcanica
Flora of Annobón
Flora of Liberia
Flora of São Tomé and Príncipe
Taxa named by John Gilbert Baker